Witchblade the Music is a compilation album of music from/inspired by the Witchblade TV series and Top Cow comic book. The songs included on this album are performed by Various Artists. It was compiled and produced by G Tom Mac, it was conceived by Christina Z and released in 2004 on the Edge Artists record label.
The album notes credit G Tom Mac a.k.a. Gerard McMahon for the music and Eddie Kislinger for the lyrics for "Wicked Town", "Drop Dead Pretty", and "Was It Magic”. McMann is also credited for "Greater Powers"; "Child of Mine" with Roger Daltrey; and "Cry Little Sister" which he wrote with Michael Maineri. In addition, McMahon and Kislinger are credited as the Executive Producers of the soundtrack.

Track listing
 "Cry Little Sister (remix)" by G Tom Mac a.k.a. Gerard McMahon – 3:57
 "Sarah" by Grant-Lee Phillips – 3:54
 "Child of Mine" by Roger Daltrey feat. G TOM MAC – 4:15
 "Dark Angel" by Essence – 4:14
 "Wicked Town" by One Live Dog – 3:43
 "Don't Fear the Reaper" by Accidental Tears – 4:54
 "Built to Survive" by Suicidal Tendencies – 3:06
 "Bombshell" by Adrianne Gonzalez – 3:30
 "Runaway" by Bret 'Epic' Mazur – 3:16
 "Falling Away" by The Like – 3:52
 "Greater Powers" by G TOM MAC – 4:18 (previously unreleased)
 "Drop Dead Pretty" by Swan Montgomery – 3:20
 "Child (Your Blood and Mine)" by Flesh – 4:24
 "Was It Magic" by G TOM MAC – 3:28 (previously unreleased)

2004 compilation albums
Television soundtracks
Witchblade
2004 soundtrack albums